= Ed S. Whitson Jr. =

American politician

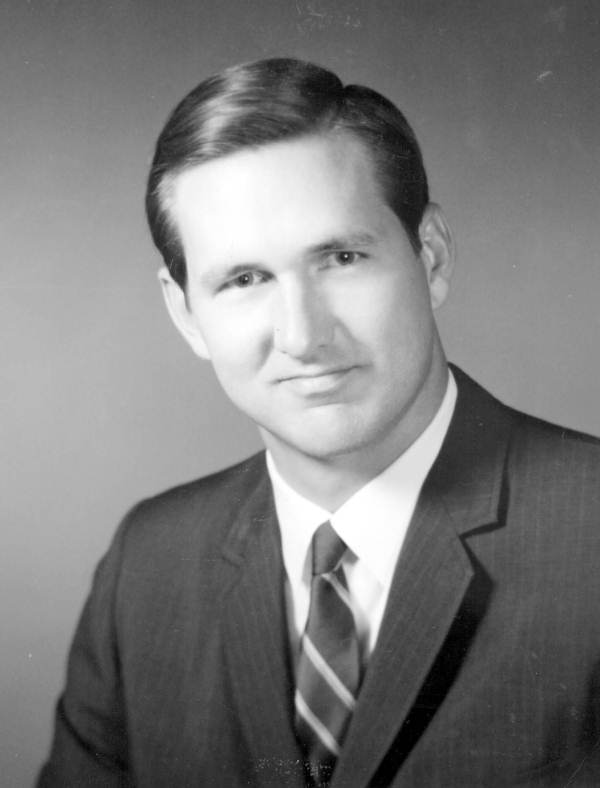

Member of the Florida House of Representatives for the 50th district
- In office 1967–1971

Member of the Florida House of Representatives from the 55th district
- In office 1973–1974

Personal details
- Born: May 18, 1941 (age 84)
- Party: Republican

Edmund Stuart Whitson Jr. (born May 18, 1941) is an American former politician in the state of Florida.

He served as a Republican in the Florida House of Representatives from 1967 to 1971, representing the 50th district, and from 1973 to 1974, this time representing the 55th district.
